Kili Poyi is a 2013 Indian Malayalam language stoner film directed by debutant Vinay Govind, a former associate of V. K. Prakash. The film stars Asif Ali, Aju Varghese, Sampath Raj, Raveendran, and Sreejith Ravi in major roles. The film was produced by SJM Entertainments and written by Joseph Kurian, Vivek Ranjit and Vinay Govind. The film features music and background score composed by Rahul Raj. Kili Poyi is considered to be the first Indian stoner film.

Plot summary
Chacko and Hari are young ad professionals who are fed up with their boss (Sandra Thomas) and her tantrums. They decide to take a break and head to Goa, where Chacko ends up meeting a beautiful foreigner (Sabreen Baker). The rest of the story revolves around their return from Goa, a mysterious bag and an extremely angry boss.

Cast

 Asif Ali as Chacko
 Aju Varghese as Hari
 Sampath Raj as Rana 
 Raveendran as Disco Douglas
 Sreejith Ravi as SI Alex Peter 
 Joju George as Tony 
 Mridul Nair as IBM
 Chemban Vinod Jose as Smuggler
 Vijay Babu as Pandey
 Sandra Thomas as Radhika
 Samata Agarwal as Jomol
 Sal Yusuf as a drug addict

Release and reception

The movie was released on 1 March 2013. Paresh C. Palicha of Rediff.com gave the film a rating of 3/5, saying the film is enjoyable.

Music

All music is composed, arranged and produced by Rahul Raj. The Hindu identified "Kili Poyi" as a song that was well liked in 2013. Raj's background score was described as having a "freshness" and "funk".

Track list

Original songs

Original background score

References 

2013 films
2010s Malayalam-language films
Films scored by Rahul Raj